Dullar is a village situated in the Patiala district of Punjab, India.

Demographics 
According to the 2011 Census of India, Dullar had a population of 1254. Males and females constituted 51.36 per cent and 48.64 per cent respectively of the population.  Literacy at that time was 56.7 per cent. People classified as Scheduled Castes under India's system of positive discrimination accounted for 43.3 per cent of the population.

References 

Villages in Patiala district